Pacto may refer to:

 Pacto de Olivos, series of documents signed by president Carlos Menem of Argentina and Raúl Alfonsín
 Pacto de Punto Fijo, accord between Venezuelan political parties
 Pacto de Sangre (album), studio album released by norteño ensemble Los Tigres del Norte
 Pacto Entre Castellanos, hip-hop group from Leganes, a neighbourhood outside Madrid, Spain
 Pacto Federal, treaty signed by the Argentine provinces of Buenos Aires, Entre Ríos and Santa Fe in 1831
 Pacto, Ecuador, rural parish at the extreme NW of Quito Canton, Ecuador